Bini may refer to:

Arts and entertainment 
 Bini (group), a Filipino girl group
 Balai Bini, architecture features of Banjar people of South Kalimantan, Indonesia
 Bini & Martini, a duo composed of house music producers and DJs Gianni Bini and Paolo Martini, from Italy
 Bini the Bunny, a 7-year-old male Holland Lop rabbit, known in YouTube

Other uses 
 Bini (grape), another name for the wine grape Merlot
 Bini (surname)
 Bini, Burkina Faso, a village in Burkina Faso
 Bini language
 Bini people, a cultural group in Nigeria
 Eupithecia bini, a moth in the family Geometridae

Language and nationality disambiguation pages